Cheng Gin Yi is a Taiwanese singer, composer, producer, and show host. He was born in Xinying, Tainan. He was mentored by Chang Fei. Yi is famous for hosting Taiwanese variety shows and singing Taiwanese Hokkien music.

Career

1962-1984
From 1962 to 1965, Yi participated in many singing competitions; among them, in five singing competitions including Tainan Victory Radio, Yunlin Huwei Radio, Changhua Guosheng Radio, Chiayi Radio and Nantou Caotun Radio, he won the singing competition. One. When Yi was ten years old, he recorded the first single "A Duty Son's Wishes" to be included in the compilation. After Yi became an adult, he was invited by host Chang Fei to serve as the host of the show. The two performances in show venues all over Taiwan were very popular, and Yi has been a household name ever since. In 1982, Yi composed the single "Feelings" for Lin Huiping , which was the first song that Yi had written for others;he has since continued to help other singers compose lyrics and music.

References

20th-century Taiwanese male singers
Hokkien singers
Taiwanese composers
1955 births
Living people